Mehibtawy Sekhemkare Amenemhat Sonbef (also Amenemhat Senbef) was an Egyptian pharaoh of the 13th Dynasty during the Second Intermediate Period. According to Egyptologists Kim Ryholt, Jürgen von Beckerath and Darrell Baker, he was the second king of the dynasty, reigning from 1800 BC until 1796 BC.

Identity 
There is a debate between Egyptologists on whether or not Sekhemkare Sonbef is the same king as Sekhemkare Amenemhat V, fourth ruler of the 13th Dynasty. Indeed, Sonbef called himself "Amenemhat Sonbef"; this can be a double name, but can also be a filiation Son of Amenemhat Sonbef, which both Ryholt and Baker see as evidence that Sonbef was a son of Amenemhat IV and a brother of Sekhemre Khutawy Sobekhotep, the founder of the 13th Dynasty. Thus, they see Sonbef and Amenemhat V as two different rulers, an opinion also shared by Jürgen von Beckerath. Ryholt and Baker further posit that Sonbef's and Amenemhat's rules were separated by the ephemeral reign of Nerikare, while von Beckerath believes it was Sekhemre Khutawy Pantjeny who reigned between the two.
At the opposite Detlef Franke and Stephen Quirke believe that Amenemhat V and Sonbef are one and the same person. Franke and others regard "Amenemhat Sonbef" as a double name. Indeed, double naming was common in Egypt and especially in the late 12th and 13th Dynasty.

Attestations 
Sonbef is attested on column 7, line 6 of the Turin canon, where he appears as "Sekhemkare [Amenemhat Sonbe]f". Although, as a king of the early 13th Dynasty, Sonbef certainly reigned from Itjtawy in the Faiyum, the only contemporary attestations of him are from south of Thebes.
These include a scarab seal of unknown provenance, a cylinder seal from the Amherst collection and now in the Metropolitan Museum of Art, and two inscribed blocks from El-Tod where he appears under the name Sekhemkare. Two Nile records are also attributable to him, one from Askut and dated to his year 3, and the other from Semna in Nubia, dated to his year 4. A further, much damaged record from Semna and dated to a year 5 may also belong to him. The ownership of these Nile records is still in doubt however, as they only bear the prenomen Sekhemkare, which Amenemhat V also bore. The Egyptologist and archaeologist Stuart Tyson Smith, who studied the records initially attributed them to Sonbef, but later changed his opinion and attributed them to Amenemhat V.

References 

18th-century BC Pharaohs
Pharaohs of the Thirteenth Dynasty of Egypt